Vajrabodhi (671–741) was an Indian esoteric Buddhist monk and teacher in Tang China. He is one of the eight patriarchs in Shingon Buddhism. He is notable for introducing Vajrayana Buddhism in the territories of the  Srivijaya Empire which subsequently evolved into a distinct form known as Indonesian Esoteric Buddhism.

Biography 
Vajrabodhi was the second of three Vajrayana missionaries to eighth-century China. He was born of a South Indian brahmin family, and his father was a priest for the royal house. Vajrabodhi probably converted to Buddhism at the age of sixteen, although some accounts place him at the Buddhist institution of Nālandā at the age of ten.
 
He studied all varieties of Buddhism and was said to have studied for a time under the famous Buddhist logician Dharmakīrti. Under Santijnana, Vajrabodhi studied Vajrayāna teachings and was duly initiated into yoga.

Leaving Agastya Mala of the Pothigai mountain range of India, Vajrabodhi traveled to Sri Lanka and Sriwijaya (present-day Palembang in the south of Sumatra Island, Indonesia), where he apparently was taught a Vajrayāna tradition distinct from that taught at Nālandā. This Tamraparniyan route had been traversed by several scholars prior, and mirrored the reach of Agastya. From Srivijaya he sailed to China via the escort of thirty-five Persian merchant-vessels, and by AD 720 was ensconced in the Jianfu Temple at the Chinese capital, Chang'an (present-day Xian). Accompanying him was his soon-to-be-famous disciple, Amoghavajra.

Like Subhakarasimha, who preceded him by four years, Vajrabodhi spent most of his time in ritual activity, in translating texts from Sanskrit to Chinese, and in the production of Esoteric art. Particularly important was his partial translation of the Sarvatathāgatatattvasagraha between the years 723 and 724. This Yoga Tantra - along with the Mahāvairocana Sutra, translated by Subhakarasimha the same year - provides the foundation of the Zhenyan school in China and the Shingon and Esoteric branch of the Tendai school in Japan. Like Subhakarasimha, Vajrabodhi had ties to high court circles and enjoyed the patronage of imperial princesses; he also taught Korean monk Hyecho; who went on to travel India and Umayyad Persia. Vajrabodhi died in 741 and was buried south of the Longmen Grottoes. He was posthumously awarded the title Guoshi ("Teacher of the Realm").

References

Bibliography
Sundberg, Jeffrey; Giebel, Rolf (2011). The Life of the Tang Court Monk Vajrabodhi as Chronicled by Lü Xiang (呂向): South Indian and Śrī Laṅkān Antecedents to the Arrival of the Buddhist Vajrayāna in Eighth-Century Java and China, Pacific World (3rd Series) 13, 129-222

Indian Buddhist missionaries
7th-century Buddhists
8th-century Buddhists
Tang dynasty Buddhist monks
Vajrayana
Indian Buddhist monks
Converts to Buddhism
Shingon Buddhism
Tendai
Indian emigrants to China
671 births
741 deaths
7th-century Indian monks
8th-century Indian monks
Monks of Nalanda
Sanskrit–Chinese translators